Cohoe (Dena'ina: Qughuhnaz’ut) is a census-designated place (CDP) in Kenai Peninsula Borough, Alaska, United States. At the 2010 census the population was 1,364, up from 1,168 in 2000.

Geography
Cohoe is located on the western side of the Kenai Peninsula at  (60.301277, -151.295952). It is bordered to the west by Cook Inlet, to the south by Clam Gulch and Ninilchik, to the east by the outlet of Tustumena Lake, and to the northeast by the Kasilof River and the communities of Kasilof and Kalifornsky.

Alaska Route 1 (Sterling Highway) passes through Cohoe, leading northeast  to Soldotna and south  to Homer.

Demographics

Cohoe first appeared on the 1960 U.S. Census as an unincorporated village. It did not appear again until 1990 when it was made a census-designated place (CDP).

As of the census of 2000, there were 1,168 people, 445 households, and 295 families residing in the CDP.  The population density was 16.7 people per square mile (6.5/km2).  There were 630 housing units at an average density of 9.0/sq mi (3.5/km2).  The racial makeup of the CDP was 90.15% White, 0.26% Black or African American, 4.54% Native American, 0.60% Asian, 0.17% Pacific Islander, 0.60% from other races, and 3.68% from two or more races.  1.71% of the population were Hispanic or Latino of any race.

There were 445 households, out of which 34.6% had children under the age of 18 living with them, 56.4% were married couples living together, 5.6% had a female householder with no husband present, and 33.7% were non-families. 26.7% of all households were made up of individuals, and 6.3% had someone living alone who was 65 years of age or older.  The average household size was 2.61 and the average family size was 3.20.

In the CDP, the population was spread out, with 31.3% under the age of 18, 4.5% from 18 to 24, 28.4% from 25 to 44, 28.2% from 45 to 64, and 7.7% who were 65 years of age or older.  The median age was 39 years. For every 100 females, there were 117.1 males.  For every 100 females age 18 and over, there were 108.0 males.

The median income for a household in the CDP was $38,542, and the median income for a family was $44,167. Males had a median income of $40,125 versus $26,154 for females. The per capita income for the CDP was $19,059.  About 8.0% of families and 12.1% of the population were below the poverty line, including 9.9% of those under age 18 and 7.9% of those age 65 or over.

References

Census-designated places in Alaska
Census-designated places in Kenai Peninsula Borough, Alaska
Populated coastal places in Alaska on the Pacific Ocean